Summerfield School Gymnasium and Community Center, also known as Summerfield Rock Gym, is a historic gymnasium building located at Summerfield, Guilford County, North Carolina. It was built in 1938-1939 as part of a Works Progress Administration (WPA) project at a rural consolidated high school. It is a 1 1/2-story, Rustic Revival-style granite rubble stone building.  It has a small concrete-block rear addition dated to about 1955.

It was listed on the National Register of Historic Places in 2012.

References

Works Progress Administration in North Carolina
Event venues on the National Register of Historic Places in North Carolina
Sports venues on the National Register of Historic Places in North Carolina
School buildings completed in 1939
Buildings and structures in Guilford County, North Carolina
National Register of Historic Places in Guilford County, North Carolina
1939 establishments in North Carolina